The Casimcea is a river in southeastern Romania. Near the village Piatra, it discharges into Lake Tașaul, which was formerly connected with the Black Sea. It flows through the villages Războieni, Casimcea, Călugăreni, Nistorești, Pantelimon de Jos, Cheia, Casian, Palazu Mic and Piatra. It discharges into Lake Tașaul near Piatra.

Tributaries
The following rivers are tributaries to the Casimcea (from source to mouth):
Left: Valea cu Piatră, Râmnic, Grădina Mucova
Right: Cartal, Pantelimon, Valea Seacă, Gura Dobrogei, Sitorman

References

Rivers of Constanța County
Rivers of Tulcea County
Rivers of Romania
0Casimcea